Ye or YE may refer to:

Language
 Ye (pronoun), a form of the second-person plural, personal pronoun "you"
 The Scots word for "you"
 A pseudo-archaic spelling of the English definite article (the). See Ye olde, and the "Ye form" section of English articles
 Ye (Cyrillic) (Е), a Cyrillic letter
 Ukrainian Ye (Є), a Cyrillic letter
 Ye (kana), an archaic Japanese kana
 A shortened slang form for "yes"

Names and people
 Ye (surname) (叶 / 葉), a Chinese surname
 Ye the Great, a figure in Chinese mythology
 Kanye West, American rapper who legally changed his name to Ye in 2021

Places
 Ye (Hebei), a city in ancient China
 Ye County, Henan, China
 Laizhou, formerly Ye County, Shandong
 Yé, Lanzarote, a village on the island of Lanzarote, Spain
 Ye, Mon State, a small town located on the southern coast of Burma
 Ye River, a river in Burma
 Ye (Korea), an ancient Korean kingdom
 Yemen (ISO 3166-1 code YE)

Other uses
 .ye, the country code top-level domain for Yemen
 "Year end", in accounting, particularly in FYE (fiscal year end)
 Ye (album), a 2018 album by Kanye West
 "Ye" (song), a song by Burna Boy

See also

Yee (disambiguation)
EY (disambiguation)

Scottish words and phrases